Granville James (birth unknown) is a Welsh former rugby union, and professional rugby league footballer who played in the 1940s and 1950s.

Rugby union club career

Four players from Newbridge RFC left to play rugby league for the 1949–50 Northern Rugby Football League season, they were; Tommy Harris to Hull FC, Bill Hopkin to Hull FC, Granville James to Hunslet and Glyn Meredith to Wakefield Trinity.

International honours
Granville James won 5 caps for Wales (RL) in 1950–1953 while at Hunslet, and won 1 cap for Other Nationalities (RL) while at Hunslet in the 32-19
victory over France at Hilton Park, Leigh on Monday 19 September 1955.

References

Living people
Hunslet F.C. (1883) players
Newbridge RFC players
Other Nationalities rugby league team players
Rugby league locks
Wales national rugby league team players
Welsh rugby league players
Welsh rugby union players
Year of birth missing (living people)